The following is a list of public housing estates in Yuen Long New Town, Hong Kong, including Home Ownership Scheme (HOS), Private Sector Participation Scheme (PSPS), Sandwich Class Housing Scheme (SCHS), Flat-for-Sale Scheme (FFSS), and Tenants Purchase Scheme (TPS) estates.

Overview

Fung Ting Court

Fung Ting Court is a Home Ownership Scheme in Yuen Long Town. It has 2 blocks built in 2001. It was formerly the site of Yuen Long Factory Estate. The factory estate was built by the Resettlement Department in 1966, in order to relocate squatter factories and cottage workshops. In 1973, the management of the estate was taken over by the Hong Kong Housing Authority. In 1997, the clearance of the estate was completed. In 2001, two small blocks were built in the site.

Shui Pin Wai Estate

Shui Pin Wai Estate is the second public housing estate in Yuen Long Town. It has 7 residential blocks mainly built in 1981, but one of the blocks, Dip Shui House, was later built in 1998.

Long Ching Estate

Long Ching Estate is the site of the former Yuen Long Estate. The former estate had five buildings and was demolished in 2001. Originally the Housing Authority planned to build three 32-storey blocks on the land. However, the District Council believed the land should be privately developed to boost the local economy. The government eventually divided the land in two, offering part of the site for private development of Yuccie Square.

The new estate comprises two blocks of non-standard design offering 483 flats. It is designed to accommodate about 1400 residents.

Long Ping Estate

Long Ping Estate is a mixed public/TPS estate in Wang Chau near MTR Long Ping station. It is the third public housing estate in Yuen Long Town. It has a total of 15 residential blocks completed between 1986 and 1989. In 2005, some of the flats were sold to tenants through Tenants Purchase Scheme Phase 6B.

Long Shin Estate

Long Bin Interim Housing

Long Bin Interim Housing is an Interim Housing estate in Castle Peak Road, Ping Shan, Yuen Long. It had eight residential blocks completed in 1999. Unlike public housing estates, it was used to accommodate affected families who are not immediately eligible for allocation of public rental housing. The estate was then demolished between 2016 and 2017 for development of public estates.

Long Bin Interim Housing is in Primary One Admission (POA) School Net 72. Within the school net are multiple aided schools (operated independently but funded with government money) and one government school: Tin Shui Wai Government Primary School (天水圍官立小學).

Wang Fu Court

Wang Fu Court is a Home Ownership Scheme estate completed in 2017. It comprises a single residential block in the Tung Tau Industrial Area, next to the Yuen Long Nullah.

See also
 Public housing in Hong Kong
 Public housing estates in Tin Shui Wai
 List of public housing estates in Hong Kong

References

Yuen Long Town
Yuen Long District